The R519 road is a regional road in Ireland which links the N21 road in  with Glenwilliam in County Limerick.

The road passes through the village of Ballingarry.

See also 

 Roads in Ireland
 National primary road
 National secondary road

References 

Regional roads in the Republic of Ireland

Roads in County Limerick